Faeto is a town and comune in the province of Foggia in the Apulia region of southeast Italy.

Residents of Faeto and neighbouring Celle di San Vito are speakers of Faetar, a daughter language of the Franco-Provençal language, which is found in an Alpine region spanning northwestern Italy, southeastern France and southwestern Switzerland. Faeto was also historically  inhabited by Arbëreshë community, but these have since assimilated.

Faeto borders the following municipalities: Biccari, Castelfranco in Miscano, Celle di San Vito, Greci, Orsara di Puglia, Roseto Valfortore.

References

 

Arbëresh settlements 

Cities and towns in Apulia